The Hemetsberger indole synthesis (also called the Hemetsberger–Knittel synthesis) is a chemical reaction that thermally decomposes a 3-aryl-2-azido-propenoic ester into an indole-2-carboxylic ester.

Yields are typically above 70%. However, this is not a popular reaction, due to the lack of stability and difficulty in synthesizing the starting material.

Reaction mechanism
The mechanism is unknown. However, azirine intermediates have been isolated. The mechanism is postulated to proceed via a nitrene intermediate.

References

Indole forming reactions
Name reactions